Bernard  Appiah   (born 10 June 1990), known by his stage name Kwesi Slay, is a Ghanaian hip hop recording artist and entertainer. He is from Ashaiman-Tema. Kwesi Slay is known for his 2018 single 'Seven'.

Career
Slay  began to gain mainstream recognition when he released his first single "3y3 normal " featuring Yaa Pono in 2015. He released “Street Ways” and” Wedi Bet” in 2017. On July 8, 2018, Kwesi's first EP Aben, was released. In December 2018, Slay released his fourth single, ”Follow Me”, featuring VGMA's high life artist of the year Kuami Eugene.

Awards and nominations

Muse Africa Awards

3 Music Awards

References

1998 births
Living people
Ghanaian musicians
Ghanaian rappers